David Stuart Byrne (born 5 March 1961) is an English former professional footballer who played as a winger.

Playing career
Byrne began his career in non-league football, before moving to Gillingham in July 1985. He moved to Millwall on 4 August 1986 for a fee of £5,000. He joined Cambridge United on loan on 8 September 1988 and Blackburn Rovers on loan on 23 February 1989. On 16 March 1989, he joined Plymouth Argyle on a free transfer. He later played for Bristol Rovers, Watford and went on loan to Reading and Fulham.

Byrne joined Shamrock Rovers in January 1993 also on loan from Watford but only made four league appearances. After returning to Watford he joined Scottish side St Johnstone and Partick Thistle. He joined Walsall on loan in February 1994 and after leaving Partick played for St Mirren, Ayr United and Albion Rovers where he was player-coach in 1996. He also had a brief loan spell at Tottenham Hotspur in 1995, featuring in their makeshift squad for the Intertoto Cup.

Coaching career
Byrne later coached the Plymouth Argyle youth team and was appointed as Director of Football at Plymouth College of Further Education.

In November 2006 Byrne was assisting Ian Atkins on a non-contract basis at Torquay United. On 28 November 2006, he left his post at PCFE when he was named as the new Youth Team Manager at Swindon Town working under former Plymouth Argyle boss Paul Sturrock. After Sturrock left Swindon to take the role of managing his previous club, Plymouth, Byrne took temporary charge of Swindon. When Maurice Malpas became manager, Byrne became his assistant. Byrne again became Caretaker manager of Swindon following the departure of manager Maurice Malpas, on 14 November 2008. Following the news that Danny Wilson was confirmed as the new manager of Swindon Town, on 26 December 2008, Byrne again reverted to being assistant manager. On 16 June 2009, he was appointed Head of Player Development at Swindon Town. He left that post in August 2010.

With the restarting of Yeovil Town's academy, in July 2015, Byrne was appointed as the new head of coaching and under 18's manager. He left his role in May 2016.

Byrne joined Dundee United as head of recruitment in March 2019.

References

External links

1961 births
Living people
Footballers from Hammersmith
English footballers
Gillingham F.C. players
Millwall F.C. players
Cambridge United F.C. players
Blackburn Rovers F.C. players
Plymouth Argyle F.C. players
Bristol Rovers F.C. players
Watford F.C. players
Reading F.C. players
Fulham F.C. players
St Johnstone F.C. players
Partick Thistle F.C. players
Walsall F.C. players
St Mirren F.C. players
Tottenham Hotspur F.C. players
Ayr United F.C. players
Albion Rovers F.C. players
Shamrock Rovers F.C. players
Armadale Thistle F.C. players
League of Ireland players
English football managers
Swindon Town F.C. managers
Swindon Town F.C. non-playing staff
Yeovil Town F.C. non-playing staff
Kingstonian F.C. players
Scottish Football League players
Association football wingers
Southall F.C. players
Hounslow F.C. players
Harrow Borough F.C. players
Hayes F.C. players
Isthmian League players
Southern Football League players
Plymouth Argyle F.C. non-playing staff
Sheffield Wednesday F.C. non-playing staff
Torquay United F.C. non-playing staff
Reading F.C. non-playing staff
Wolverhampton Wanderers F.C. non-playing staff
Dundee United F.C. non-playing staff